Pratibha Sinha is a former Indian actress working in Bollywood movies and the daughter of Mala Sinha, a former Bollywood actress herself and Mala Sinha was one of the highest paid and most popular actress back in late 50s 60s and 70s. She made her film debut opposite Sujoy Mukherjee (son of 1960s star Joy Mukherjee) in the 1992 film Mehboob Mere Mehboob. She is mostly remembered for her dance performance in the 1996 blockbuster Raja Hindustani in the song "Pardesi Pardesi". She quit acting in 2000.

Filmography
 Le Chal Apne Sang (2000)
 Military Raaj (1998) as Priya
 Zanjeer (1998)
 Koi Kisi Se Kum Nahin (1997)
 Deewana Mastana (1997) as Tina
 Gudgudee (1997) 
 Raja Hindustani (1996) as (Guest appearance) Gyspy Dancer in the song "Pardesi Pardesi"
 Tu Chor Main Sipahi (1996) as Rani
 Ek Tha Raja (1996) as Kitty
 Pokiri Raja (1994) (Telugu)
 Dil Hai Betaab (1993) as Meena
 Kal Ki Awaaz (1992) as Shagufa 'Shagufi' Haider Jaffri
 Mehboob Mere Mehboob (1992) as Heer Choudhry

References

External links
 
 

Year of birth missing (living people)
Living people
Indian film actresses
Actresses in Hindi cinema
Indian Gorkhas
Indian people of Nepalese descent